The flag of Trinidad and Tobago was adopted upon independence from the United Kingdom on 31 August 1962. Designed by Carlisle Chang (1921–2001), the flag of Trinidad and Tobago was chosen by the independence committee of 1962. Red, black and white symbolise fire (the sun, representing courage), earth (representing dedication) and water (representing purity and equality).

It is one of the few national flags incorporating a diagonal line, with other examples including the DR Congo, Tanzania, Namibia, and Brunei.

Design

The flag of Trinidad and Tobago is a red field with a white-edged black diagonal band from the upper hoist side to the lower fly-side. In blazon, Gules, a bend Sable fimbriated Argent. It was designed by Carlisle Chang.

Construction

The total width of the three stripes together is, therefore,  of the length.

Other flags
The civil ensign is the national flag in a 1:2 ratio.  The naval ensign (used by Coast Guard vessels) is a British white ensign with the national flag in the canton.

British colonial flag
Prior to independence from the United Kingdom in August 1962, Trinidad and Tobago used a British blue ensign defaced with a badge depicting a ship arriving in front of a mountain.

See also
Flag of the West Indies Federation (January 1958 – May 1962)
Coat of arms of Trinidad and Tobago

References

Flags introduced in 1962
Flag
National flags